RAF Mauripur was a Royal Air Force station in British India 4 miles north west of the centre of Karachi.  It is now known as Masroor Airbase.

History
RAF Mauripur opened in 1942 as a transit airfield allowing RAF Drigh Road to concentrate on maintenance. Huge numbers of aircraft staged through Mauripur during and after the end of World War II. British units continued to use the airfield after the creation of Pakistan in 1947, finally leaving in 1956. The RAF airfields at Gan and Masirah took over RAF Far East Air Force staging duties from Mauripur and Habbaniya (which became unavailable from 14 July 1958 after the revolution in Iraq).

Units and aircraft

References

External links
RAF Mauripur Association Website
The strike at R.A.F Mauripur

Maur
Maur
Maur
Maur